Michael Chigozie Alagwu, better known by his stage name Tempoe, is a Nigerian record producer,  DJ,  singer and songwriter. Born in Lagos, Nigeria, he is popularly known for the tag "MÄD!", at the beginning or end of all his music productions. His production of CKay's breakout afrobeats song, Love Nwantiti received global recognition.

He has produced tracks for Omah Lay, Joeboy, CKay, Jason Derulo, Victony amongst others and is currently signed to Panda Entertainment.

Musical career
Tempoe began his career as a statistician and web developer in Nigeria's budding tech industry. He had always found pleasure in music, teaching himself basic production techniques using the fruity loops app and producing songs for free, before a chance meeting with then afrobeats producer, CKay, led to him producing the latter's first official single, "Nkechi Turnup" in 2016. He went on to produce other songs, such as Container for CKay and Play for Blaqbonez, both signed to Chocolate City. In a bid to improve his production skills, he enrolled at Sarz's Production Academy.

In 2019, Tempoe collaborated again with CKay in the production of the afro-fusion single, Love Nwantiti. The track has been certified platinum in France and the United Kingdom and double platinum in the United States and the Netherlands. In November 2020, Tempoe teamed up with singer Omah Lay, producing another successful single, Godly, which garnered over 100 million accumulated streams across all music sharing platforms, peaking at number 5 and number 15 in Ghana and Kenya's top 100 tracks on iTunes. Tempoe also produced the single Door from Joeboy's debut album, Somewhere Between Beauty & Magic, and Alcohol, which received 50 million streams within four weeks of its release.

In May 2022, he produced and performed in the single, Soweto, the lead track off Victony's Outlaw EP, which is his first official single as a performing artiste. Tempoe released the video for Soweto in October 2022. The video was directed by Jyde Ajala and garnered over 8 million views on YouTube within four weeks. The song featured at number 15 on Rolling Stone magazine's Top 40 Afropop Songs of 2022.

In 2022, Tempoe signed a publishing deal with American independent record publishing group, APG, and the partnership led to his being tapped to co-write and produce Robinson and Jason Derulo's single Ayo Girl, which features fellow Nigerian afrobeat act, Rema.

Awards and recognition
Tempoe received a nomination for the African Producer of the Year at the 2022 African Muzik Magazine Awards (AFRIMMA) alongside Pheelz from Nigeria and DJ Maphoriza from South Africa in September 2022. In October 2022, he was honored by  BMI at the BMI Awards London for his contribution to the song Love Nwantiti in the category of Most Performed Song of the Year. He was listed in the TurnTable End of the Year Top 50 of 2021 as a Top Producer of the Year.

Production discography
2016
 Nkechi Turnup - CKay
 Container - Ckay
 Play - Blaqbonez

2019
 Love Nwantiti - CKay
 Jensimi - Reminisce featuring Niniola 

2020
 Godly - Omah Lay
 Party Dé - DJ Lambo featuring Buju

2021
 Understand - Omah Lay
 Bend You - Omah Lay
 Door - Joeboy
 Soso - Omah Lay
 Alcohol (Sip) - Joeboy
 Purple Song - Omah Lay
 Piece of Mind - Mayorkun
 100 Metres - Teni
 On - Teni
 Door (remix) - Joeboy Featuring Kwesi Arthur

2022
 The Front Door - MI Abaga featuring Duncan Mighty
 Soweto - Victony and Tempoe
 Ayo Girl - Robinson and Jason Derulo featuring Rema
 Contour - Joeboy
 Iz Going - Bad Boy Timz
 Something to Lose -  Wurld
 Press - Wurld
 Same as You - Wurld
 Mine - Blanche Bailly and Joeboy
 Winter Wonderland/Don't Worry be Happy - Omah Lay

References 

Living people
Nigerian hip hop record producers
21st-century Nigerian musicians
1996 births
Afrobeat musicians
Nigerian songwriters